WGRK (1540 AM) was a radio station licensed to Greensburg, Kentucky, United States. The station was owned by Green County CBC, Inc. and featured programming from ABC Radio  and Jones Radio Network.

History
The station went on the air in 1972, and changed its call letters to WAKY on April 14,1988. On November 5, 2007, the station changed its call sign back to WGRK.

The station's owners surrendered its license to the Federal Communications Commission on December 21, 2018, who cancelled the license the same day.

References

External links
FCC Station Search Details: DWGRK (Facility ID: 69851)
FCC History Cards for WGRK (covering 1968-1980)

GRK
Radio stations established in 1972
1972 establishments in Kentucky
Defunct radio stations in the United States
Radio stations disestablished in 2018
2018 disestablishments in Kentucky
GRK
GRK
Greensburg, Kentucky